Throughout more than 76 seasons, the National Basketball Association (NBA) has had many intense rivalries. This article lists some of the famous rivalries in the NBA. Rivalries are classified into three primary groups; intradivisional, interdivisional, and interconference.

Interconference rivalries comprise games between opponents in different conferences. A team plays each opponent from the other conference in one home game and one away game.

Intradivisional rivalries comprise games between opponents in the same division. Since the 2004–05 NBA season, there are 30 teams in six divisions of 5 teams each. Each team plays each division opponent 4 times during the regular season (twice at home, twice away) for a total of 16 games out of 82 total regular season games.
 
Interdivisional rivalries comprise games between opponents in different divisions but within the same conference. A team plays against each team from the other two divisions in its conference either three or four times. The total interdivisional games an NBA team plays is 36. Conference games are often important, as a team's record in common games, as well as its overall record against its conference, are sometimes used as tiebreakers for playoff seeding at the end of the regular season. Also, many regular season opponents have met again in the playoffs, and the result of a regular season game can affect where the playoff game will be played.

Interconference rivalries
Cavaliers–Warriors rivalry
Celtics–Lakers rivalry
Lakers–Pistons rivalry

Eastern Conference

Atlantic Division
76ers–Celtics rivalry
Celtics–Knicks rivalry
Knicks–Nets rivalry
Nets–Raptors rivalry

Central Division
Bulls–Cavaliers rivalry
Bulls–Pistons rivalry

Southeast Division
Heat–Magic rivalry

Interdivisional
Bulls–Knicks rivalry
Celtics–Pistons rivalry
Heat–Knicks rivalry
Knicks–Pacers rivalry

Western Conference

Pacific Division
 Lakers–Clippers rivalry

Southwest Division
Mavericks–Spurs rivalry
Rockets–Spurs rivalry

Interdivisional
 Jazz–Rockets rivalry
 Lakers–Spurs rivalry
 Spurs–Suns rivalry

See also
 Major League Baseball rivalries
 MLS rivalry cups
 National Football League rivalries
 National Hockey League rivalries

 
Rivalries